Alumim is a kibbutz located in the northwestern Negev desert in southern Israel, near  the Gaza Strip. It falls under the jurisdiction of Sdot Negev Regional Council.

History
Kibbutz Alumim was established in 1966 as a border settlement with Egypt by Bnei Akiva members from a Nahal gar'in. Its land had belonged to the Religious Kibbutz Movement since the 1940s and was previously farmed by kibbutz Be'erot Yitzhak, which was relocated as a result of its destruction in the 1948 Arab–Israeli War.

Over the years other Nahal groups joined the kibbutz, as well as groups of immigrants from World Bnei Akiva. The largest groups from abroad came from the United Kingdom. Today Alumim has about 140 members, around 70 families. About 20% of the membership are immigrants from the UK.

Through ninth grade, the children of Kibbutz Alumim attend Da'at Regional school in Kibbutz Sa'ad.

Economy

The economy of Alumim is based on agriculture and tourism. Alumim has maintained the classic kibbutz collective life style. Each member receives an allowance based on his or her needs (size of family, age of children etc.). The allowance is not connected to the occupation of the member. There are no monetary incentives for any form of work. Chores such as serving in the dining hall, guard duty at night, milking the cows at the weekend are done on a rota basis. They produce and sell carrots, potatoes, sweet potatoes and other organic products  as well as avocado, chickens, and peppers. The kibbutz guest house has 22 self-contained apartments.

References

External links
Official website 

Kibbutzim
Religious Kibbutz Movement
Populated places established in 1966
Gaza envelope
Populated places in Southern District (Israel)
1966 establishments in Israel
British-Jewish culture in Israel